is a Japanese international rugby union player who plays as a Hooker.

References

1991 births
Living people
People from Hyōgo Prefecture
Sportspeople from Hyōgo Prefecture
Japanese rugby union players
Japan international rugby union players
Rugby union hookers
Yokohama Canon Eagles players
Sunwolves players